Pui-Yeung Cheung (November 5, 1919September 6, 1987) was a Chinese Episcopalian bishop was served as Bishop of Taiwan (diocesan bishop of the Episcopal Diocese of Taiwan) from 1969 to 1977.

An alumnus of Ming Hua Theological College, he was made deacon in May 1966 and ordained priest the following year (by James C. L. Wong, Bishop of Taiwan); and consecrated a bishop on January 6, 1980 (by John Allin, Presiding Bishop, at St John's Cathedral, Taipei).

References 

1921 births
1987 deaths
20th-century American Episcopalians
Episcopal bishops of Taiwan
20th-century American clergy